“Lithocolletis” aurifascia is a moth of the family Gracillariidae. It is known from Saint Helena.

The larvae feed on Commidendrum robustum. They probably mine the leaves of their host plant.

Taxonomy
A 2012 study revealed that the species does not belong to Lithocolletinae according to external morphology.

References

Moths described in 1875
aurifascia
Moths of Africa